Aghilès Benchaâbane (born September 13, 1989) is an Algerian footballer. He currently plays for USM Annaba in the Algerian Ligue Professionnelle 1.

International career
In 2008, Benchaâbane was called up to the Algerian Under-20 National Team for a 2009 African Youth Championship qualifier against Mauritania. He came in as a substitute in the 63rd minute as the game ended 0-0.

References

External links
 DZFoot Profile
 

1989 births
Living people
Footballers from Tizi Ouzou
Kabyle people
Algerian footballers
Algerian Ligue Professionnelle 1 players
JS Kabylie players
USM Alger players
USM Annaba players
Algeria youth international footballers
Association football forwards
21st-century Algerian people